Artz Pedregal is a mixed-use development opened on March 9, 2018 and is located along the Anillo Periférico ring road in the Pedregal de San Ángel area of southwestern Mexico City. The shopping mall focuses on luxury retailers. It features a gallery of large-scale installations of public art, and was designed by Sordo Madaleno Arquitectos. Tenants include luxury retailers Louis Vuitton, Dior, Hermes, Gucci, Prada, Fendi, and Cartier, as well as Hamley's toys, Roche Bobois West Elm, Cinemex multicinemas, and Mexico's first Starbucks Reserve Bar. No major department stores anchor the mall.
On July 12, 2018, a constituent building of the mall collapsed.

Public art
Public art featured includes Forever by Ai Weiwei, De la rotonda a la fuente. 5 colores para México, trabajo in situ. México 2018. Homenaje al Arquitecto Manuel Tolsá ("From the roundabout to the fountain. 5 colors for Mexico, in situ work. Mexico City 2018. Memorial to architect Manuel Tolsá") by Daniel Buren, and Quisco sonoro by Tania Candiani.

Gallery

References

Shopping malls in Greater Mexico City
Mixed-use developments in Mexico
Sculpture in Mexico
Public art